Point and click are the actions of a computer user moving a pointer to a certain location on a screen (pointing) and then pressing a button on a mouse, usually the left button (click), or other pointing device. An example of point and click is in hypermedia, where users click on hyperlinks to navigate from document to document.

Point and click can be used with any number of input devices varying from mouses, touch pads, trackpoint, joysticks, scroll buttons, and roller balls.

User interfaces, for example graphical user interfaces, are sometimes described as "point-and-click interfaces", often to suggest that they are very easy to use, requiring that the user simply point to indicate their wishes.  These interfaces are sometimes referred to condescendingly (e.g., by Unix users) as "click-and-drool" or "point-and-drool" interfaces.

The use of this phrase to describe software implies that the interface can be controlled solely through the mouse (or some other means such as a stylus), with little or no input from the keyboard, as with many graphical user interfaces.

In some systems, such as Internet Explorer, moving the pointer over a link (or other GUI control) and waiting for a split-second (that can range from 0.004 to 0.7 s) can cause a tooltip to be displayed.

Single click 
A single click or "click" is the act of pressing a computer mouse button once without moving the mouse. Single clicking is usually a primary action of the mouse.  Single clicking, by default in many operating systems, selects (or highlights) an object while double-clicking executes or opens the object. The single-click has many advantages over double click due to the reduced time needed to complete the action.  The single-click or one-click phrase has also been used to apply to the commercial field as a competitive advantage.  The slogan "single click" or "one-click" has become very common to show clients the ease of use of their services.

On icons
By default on most computer systems, for a person to select a certain software function, they will have to click on the left button. An example of this can be a person clicking on an icon. Similarly, clicking on the right button will present the user with a text menu to select more actions. These actions can range from open, explore, properties, etc.  In terms of entertainment software, point-and-click interfaces are common input methods, usually offering a 'menu' or 'icon bar' interface that functions expectedly. In other games, the character explores different areas within the game world. To move to another area, the player will move the cursor to one point of the screen, where the cursor will turn into an arrow. Clicking will then move the player to that area.

On text
In many text processing programs, such as web browsers or word processors, clicking on text moves the cursor to that location. Clicking and holding the left button will allow users to highlight the selected text enabling the user with more options to edit or use the text.

Double click 

A double click is most commonly used with a computer mouse when the pointer is placed over an icon or object and the button is quickly pressed twice. This action, when performed without moving the location of the mouse, will produce a double click.

Fitts's Law
Fitts's law can be used to quantify the time required to perform a point-and-click action.

where:
  is the average time taken to complete the movement.
  represents the start/stop time of the device and  stands for the inherent speed of the device. These constants can be determined experimentally by fitting a straight line to measured data.
  is the distance from the starting point to the center of the target.
  is the width of the target measured along the axis of motion.  can also be thought of as the allowed error tolerance in the final position since the final point of the motion must fall within  of the target's centre.

See also

 Double-click
 Triple-click
 Mouse chording
 Drag and drop
 Click here
 Graphical user interface
 1-Click (one-click buying)
 Point-and-click adventure game

References

External links
 Institute for Interactive Research, website interface without any mechanisms to click on for a different way of navigation
 Online Mouse Tester  Tool
User interface techniques